Nelzha is a rural locality (a selo) in Stupinskoye Rural Settlement, Ramonsky District, Voronezh Oblast, Russia. The population was 284 as of 2010. There are 12 streets.

Geography 
Nelzha is located 20 km north of Ramon (the district's administrative centre) by road. SNT 'Vitta' is the nearest rural locality.

References 

Rural localities in Ramonsky District